The Humboldt orogeny was a widespread mountain building event, preserved in rocks throughout much of East Antarctica including Mac. Robertson Land and the Humboldt Mountains of Queen Maud Land. The event deformed miogeoclinal deposits.

See also
List of orogenies

References

Humboldt
Orogeny